William B. Stephenson (died February 13, 1884) was an American politician and judge from Maryland. He served in the Maryland House of Delegates and Maryland Senate.

Early life
William B. Stephenson was born in Harford County, Maryland, to Mary (née Hopkins) and James Stephenson. His brother was George Stephenson.

Career
Stephenson was a Whig and changed to the Democratic Party during President Jackson's second campaign. He started his political career in 1830. In 1830, Stephenson was elected to the Harford County Levy Court. Stephenson served as a member of the Maryland House of Delegates, representing Harford County, in 1843, 1845 to 1846 and 1852 to 1853. He served as a member of the Maryland Senate, representing Harford County, from 1865 to 1867 and 1870 to 1872. He was succeeded by John Carroll Walsh.

Stephenson was a lawyer and owned a farm of 300 acres in Harford County.

Personal life
Stephenson was married. They had no children. His wife predeceased him.

Stephenson died on February 13, 1884, at the age of 82, at his home near Rock Run in Harford County, Maryland. He was buried at Rock Run United Methodist Church.

References

Year of birth unknown
1884 deaths
People from Harford County, Maryland
Democratic Party members of the Maryland House of Delegates
Democratic Party Maryland state senators
Maryland lawyers
19th-century American politicians